Antonis Natsouras (born 18 December 1979) is a Greek former professional footballer.

Career
Born in Meliki, Imathia, Natsouras began playing football for local side Phillipas Meliki. He joined Alpha Ethniki side Veria F.C. in 1997. Veria was relegated twice during his time with the club. He returned to the Alpha Ethniki with Iraklis Thessaloniki F.C. in 2001.

Natsouras had a brief spell with Ionikos F.C. before moving to Italy. He initially joined Torino F.C., but after failing to settle signed a two-year contract with A.C. ChievoVerona in August 2005.

In January 2012, Natsouras signed for Iraklis 1908 FC.

References

External links
Profile at Onsports.gr
Profile at Guardian Football

1979 births
Living people
Greek footballers
Greek expatriate footballers
Super League Greece players
Serie B players
Veria F.C. players
Iraklis Thessaloniki F.C. players
Ionikos F.C. players
Kallithea F.C. players
OFI Crete F.C. players
Panthrakikos F.C. players
Torino F.C. players
A.C. ChievoVerona players
U.S. Cremonese players
Expatriate footballers in Italy
Association football midfielders
People from Imathia
Footballers from Central Macedonia